Pedro Paulo Alves Vieira dos Reis (born 10 February 1994), known as Pedro Paulo, is a Brazilian professional footballer who plays as a forward.

Club career
Born in Arrozal, Piraí, Rio de Janeiro, Pedro Paulo began his career at Cruzeiro and, on 6 November 2014, was loaned to fellow Série A team Clube Atlético Paranaense. He was first included in a matchday squad on 2 November 2014, remaining an unused substitute in their 1–0 home win over Clube Atlético Mineiro in Série A. Three weeks later he made his professional debut, as an added-time replacement for Marcelo Cirino at the end of a 2–1 win at Esporte Clube Bahia. On 7 December, in the last game of the season, he made his only other appearance in a 1–1 draw at Palmeiras, again off the bench. In February 2015, he made three substitute appearances in the season's Campeonato Paranaense.

On 13 July 2015, he was loaned out again, to Portugal's Rio Ave, for the upcoming Primeira Liga campaign.

International career
Paulo was part of the Brazil U17 squad which won the 2011 South American Under-17 Football Championship, playing eight games and scoring twice in a 4–3 win over Venezuela in the opener on 13 March.

Honour
Individual

 AFC Cup top goalscorer: 2022

References

External links

1994 births
Living people
Sportspeople from Rio de Janeiro (state)
Brazilian footballers
Brazil youth international footballers
Association football forwards
Campeonato Brasileiro Série A players
Esporte Clube Cruzeiro players
Club Athletico Paranaense players
Rio Ave F.C. players
Académico de Viseu F.C. players
Liga Portugal 2 players
Brazilian expatriate footballers
Expatriate footballers in Portugal
Brazilian expatriate sportspeople in Portugal